The Kirzhach is a river in Vladimir Oblast, Russia. It is a left tributary of the Klyazma. The length of the river is 133 km. The area of its drainage basin is 1770 km². The Kirzhach originates from the confluence of the Bolshoy Kirzhach and the Maly Kirzhach near Ivashevo Village. The river flows from north to south and empties into the Klyazma at Gorodishchi. The Kirzhach is a shallow river with a maximum depth of 4 m and a maximum width of 70 m. It is not navigable for larger vessels, however it is very popular for canoeing and kayaking. Its major tributary is the Sheredar. The towns of Kirzhach and Gorodishchi are located on the shores of the Kirzhach.

The name is from Mordvin: ,  'left' (sc. tributary).

References 

Rivers of Moscow Oblast
Rivers of Vladimir Oblast